Estudios Churubusco is one of the oldest and largest movie studios in Mexico. It is located in the Churubusco neighborhood of Mexico City.

History

It was inaugurated in 1945 after a 1943 agreement between RKO and Emilio Azcárraga Vidaurreta (of Televisa). In 1950 it was acquired by the government of Mexico and merged with Estudios y Laboratorios Azteca to form Estudios Churubusco Azteca. Since 1958 it has been controlled by the government of Mexico.  Of the four motion picture studios during the golden age of Mexican cinema—the others were Estudios America, Estudios San Angel and Estudios Tepeyac—it and Televisa San Angel (the former Estudios San Angel) are still in operation.

It is estimated that 95% of the films produced in Mexico since 2000 have used many of the services the studio provides. Among the films shot at the Estudios Churubusco were Honey, I Shrunk the Kids (1989), Amores perros, nominee for an Academy Award for Best Foreign Language Film (1999), and Frida (2001).

In 2017, Estudios Churubusco celebrated its 72nd anniversary by opening the facility to the public for the first time so  they could learn more about the studios and its many film achievements.

Selected films

References

External links 

 Watch a 1990 "making-of" documentary about the production of Total Recall at Estudios Churubusco.

RKO General
1945 establishments in Mexico
1950 mergers and acquisitions
Mexican film studios
State-owned film companies
Golden Ariel Award winners
Coyoacán